Hymenoxys richardsonii, the pingue hymenoxys or pingue rubberweed, is a North American species of plants in the sunflower family. It is widespread across the western United States and western Canada from Arizona, New Mexico, and western Texas north as far as Alberta and Saskatchewan.

Varieties
Hymenoxys richardsonii var. floribunda (A.Gray) K.F.Parker – Arizona, Colorado, New Mexico, Texas, Utah
Hymenoxys richardsonii var. richardsonii – Alberta, Saskatchewan, Colorado, Montana, North Dakota, Utah, Wyoming

Uses
Among the Zuni people of New Mexico, a poultice of the chewed root applied to sores and rashes, and an infusion of the root is used for stomachache.

References

richardsonii
Flora of North America
Plants used in traditional Native American medicine
Plants described in 1833